The 2011 FIFA World Cup may refer to the following football (soccer) competitions:

Women's 2011 FIFA Women's World Cup
Youth: 2011 FIFA U-20 World Cup
Junior: 2011 FIFA U-17 World Cup
Club: 2011 FIFA Club World Cup
Beach soccer: 2011 FIFA Beach Soccer World Cup